The VBK-Raduga capsule was a reentry capsule that was used for returning materials to Earth's surface from the space station Mir. They were brought to Mir in the Progress-M cargo craft's dry cargo compartment. For return, the capsule would be substituted for the Progress' docking probe before it left the space station, and then after the Progress-M performed its deorbit burn, the capsule was ejected at 120 km altitude to reenter the atmosphere independently. It would then parachute to a landing area in Russia.

Each Raduga was about 1.5 m long, 60 cm in diameter, and had an unloaded mass of about 350 kg. It could return about 150 kg of cargo back to Earth. Use of the Raduga reduced the Progress-M's cargo capacity by about 100 kg, to a maximum of about 2400 kg.

The European Space Agency studied a very similar system called PARES (Payload Retrieval System), for use in combination with the Automated Transfer Vehicle.

See also
HTV Small Re-entry Capsule

References

Mir